David Gunn may refer to:

David Gunn (author), military science fiction author
David Gunn (composer), American composer
David Gunn (doctor) (1946–1993), American doctor and murder victim
David John Gunn (1887–1955), New Zealand farmer and bushman
David L. Gunn (born 1937), American-Canadian railroad administrator
David M. Gunn, Old Testament scholar
David Gunn (American football), American football coach
David Gunn (singer), lead vocalist for American heavy metal band King 810